Aperture of pelvis may refer to:

 Pelvic inlet, or superior aperture of the pelvis
 Pelvic outlet, or inferior aperture of the pelvis